Old Gore is an unincorporated community in Hocking County, in the U.S. state of Ohio.

History
Old Gore was originally called Gore. When a blast furnace was built nearby at Hamlin/Burgessville, the latter two rival towns merged to become "New Gore".

References

Unincorporated communities in Hocking County, Ohio
Unincorporated communities in Ohio